The following article presents a summary of the 1975 football (soccer) season in Brazil, which was the 74th season of competitive football in the country.

Campeonato Brasileiro Série A

Third Stage

Group A

Group B

3 points for victory by a difference of two or more goals, 2 points for victory, 1 point for draw.

Semifinals

Final

Internacional declared as the Campeonato Brasileiro champions.

State championship champions

(1)Botafogo-PB and Treze shared the Paraíba State Championship title.
(2)River and Tiradentes-PI shared the Piauí State Championship title.

Youth competition champions

Other competition champions

Brazilian clubs in international competitions

Brazil national team
The following table lists all the games played by the Brazil national football team in official competitions and friendly matches during 1975.

References

 Brazilian competitions at RSSSF
 1975 Brazil national team matches at RSSSF

 
Seasons in Brazilian football
Brazil